The Bala tube-nosed bat (Murina balaensis) is a critically endangered species of bat found in Thailand.

Taxonomy and etymology
It was first encountered in September 2012.
Its closest relative is Eleryi's tube-nosed bat (Murina eleryi).
As the genus Murina is split into species groups, the Bala tube-nosed bat is placed into the suilla group, which also contains the little tube-nosed bat, Beelzebub's tube-nosed bat, the ashy-gray tube-nosed bat, Eleryi's tube-nosed bat, the slender tube-nosed bat, Murina harpioloides, the greater tube-nosed bat, Murina recondita, the forest tube-nosed bat (sometimes considered synonymous with the Ussuri tube-nosed bat), the brown tube-nosed bat, Scully's tube-nosed bat, and Ussuri tube-nosed bat.
Its species name, balaensis, refers to the Bala Forest of Thailand where it is found.

Description
It is a small bat, weighing only .
The ears are brown in color, with the base of the ear a lighter brown.
Their dorsal fur is ashy-gray, with some hairs tipped in a reddish-orange tint of brown.
Other dorsal hairs are tipped in a charcoal black color.
Their heads, backs, uropatagia, and feet have silver-gold guard hairs.
On their ventral side, their hairs are dark gray at the base, but whitish gray at the tips.
The calcar is well-developed, but lacks a keel.

Biology
It likely roosts in leaves or hollow trees.

Range and habitat
It occurs in moist, evergreen lowland rainforests in the Narathiwat Province of southern Thailand.
It has only been encountered in the Bala Forest of Hala-Bala Wildlife Sanctuary.

Conservation
It is currently evaluated as critically endangered by the IUCN.
Also, there is a projected decline in the quality and extent of their habitat.
It is threatened by habitat loss due to deforestation and the expansion of agriculture.

References

Mammals described in 2013
Bats of Southeast Asia
Murininae
Mammals of Thailand
Endemic fauna of Thailand